Alta Lake State Park is a public recreation area located  southwest of Pateros, Washington, at the northern end of   Alta Lake, in the mountainous northwest interior of the state. The  state park and adjacent lake lie beneath towering stone cliffs, formed by glaciation, that rise 1000 feet (304 m) above the valley floor, and carry on up to the top of Old Goat Mountain which sits 4200 ft (1280 m) above the park. A two-mile-long (3 km) road leading to the park, Alta Lake Road, intersects State Route 153, which runs along the Methow River. The park is managed by the Washington State Parks and Recreation Commission.

History
A jeweler and miner from Wilbur named the lake in 1900 after his daughter, Alta Heinz. In 1951, the city of Pateros gave the property to the state for the establishment of a state park. In 2014, the park was severely damaged during the Carlton Complex Fire, which forced the park to close for five weeks. Recovery efforts are on-going.

Activities and amenities
Golf is offered at the nearby Alta Lake Golf Course.

References

External links

Alta Lake State Park Washington State Parks and Recreation Commission 
Alta Lake State Park Map Washington State Parks and Recreation Commission

State parks of Washington (state)
Parks in Okanogan County, Washington
Protected areas established in 1951
1951 establishments in Washington (state)